Twelve women's teams competed in basketball at the 1996 Summer Olympics.

Australia
The following players represented Australia:

 Carla Boyd
 Michelle Brogan-Griffiths
 Sandy Brondello
 Michelle Chandler
 Allison Cook-Tranquilli
 Trisha Fallon
 Robyn Maher
 Fiona Robinson-Hannan
 Shelley Gorman-Sandie
 Rachael Sporn
 Michele Timms
 Jenny Whittle

Brazil
The following players represented Brazil:

 Hortência
 Paula
 Janeth
 Marta Sobral
 Alessandra
 Branca
 Adriana
 Leila
 Roseli
 Silvinha
 Cíntia
 Cláudia

Canada
The following players represented Canada:

 Bev Smith
 Karla Karch-Gailus
 Camille Thompson
 Sue Stewart
 Shawna Molcak
 Jodi Evans
 Cynthia Johnston
 Dianne Norman
 Martina Jerant
 Kelly Boucher
 Andrea Blackwell
 Marlelynn Lange-Harris

China
The following players represented China:

 Zheng Dongmei
 Liang Xin
 Zheng Haixia
 He Jun
 Ma Zongqing
 Miao Bo
 Li Xin
 Liu Jun
 Shen Li
 Chu Hui
 Li Dongmei
 Ma Chengqing

Cuba
The following players represented Cuba:

 Tania Seino
 María León
 Yamilé Martínez
 Dalia Henry
 Milayda Enríquez
 Lisdeivis Víctores
 Olga Vigil
 Grisel Herrera
 Biosotis Lagnó
 Judith Águila
 Cariola Hechavarría
 Gertrudis Gómez

Italy
The following players represented Italy:

 Susanna Bonfiglio
 Mara Fullin
 Nicoletta Caselin
 Catarina Pollini
 Giuseppina Tufano
 Stefania Zanussi
 Elena Paparazzo
 Valentina Gardellin
 Viviana Ballabio
 Marta Rezoagli
 Lorenza Arnetoli
 Novella Schiesaro

Japan
The following players represented Japan:

 Aki Ichijo
 Chikako Murakami
 Taeko Oyama
 Mikiko Hagiwara
 Kikuko Mikawa
 Kagari Yamada
 Takako Kato
 Yuka Harada
 Akemi Okazato
 Mayumi Kawasaki
 Mutsuko Nagata
 Noriko Hamaguchi

Russia
The following players represented Russia:

 Lyudmila Konovalova
 Yevgeniya Nikonova
 Irina Rutkovskaya
 Maria Stepanova
 Elena Baranova
 Nataliya Svinukhova
 Svetlana Kuznetsova
 Irina Sumnikova
 Elen Bunatyants-Shakirova
 Yelena Pshikova
 Svetlana Zaboluyeva-Antipova

South Korea
The following players represented South Korea:

 Kim Ji-yun
 Jeon Ju-won
 Gwon Eun-jeong
 Han Hyeon-seon
 Yu Yeong-ju
 Park Jeong-eun
 Kim Jeong-min
 An Seon-mi
 Cheon Eun-suk
 Lee Jong-ae
 Jeong Seon-min
 Jeong Eun-sun

Ukraine
The following players represented Ukraine:

 Ruslana Kyrychenko
 Viktoriya Burenok
 Olena Zhyrko
 Maryna Tkachenko
 Liudmyla Nazarenko
 Olena Oberemko
 Viktoriya Paradiz
 Viktoriya Leleka
 Oksana Dovhaliuk
 Diana Sadovnykova
 Nataliya Silianova
 Olha Shliakhova

United States
The following players represented the United States:

 Teresa Edwards
 Ruthie Bolton-Holifield
 Sheryl Swoopes
 Lisa Leslie
 Katrina McClain
 Dawn Staley
 Jennifer Azzi
 Carla McGhee
 Katy Steding
 Rebecca Lobo
 Venus Lacy
 Nikki McCray

Zaire
The following players represented Zaire:

 Mwadi Mabika
 Lukengu Ngalula
 Kasala Kamanga
 Muene Tshijuka
 Mukendi Mbuyi
 Kakengwa Pikinini
 Zaina Kapepula
 Patricia N'Goy Benga
 Kongolo Amba
 Lileko Bonzali
 Kaninga Mbambi
 Natalie Lobela

References

1996
Women's events at the 1996 Summer Olympics